Lawrence Dean Hickman (October 9, 1935 – February 10, 2017) was a professional American football fullback in the National Football League for the Chicago Cardinals and Green Bay Packers. He played college football at Baylor University and was drafted in the third round (31st overall) of the 1959 NFL Draft by the Los Angeles Rams.

Early years
Hickman was born in Spring Hill, on October 10, 1935, to O.B. and Mattie Jane Hickman as the youngest of four boys, with brothers John, Warner and Waller. He acquired a love of music as a child, and sang for churches, banquets, weddings and theater productions all his life. Hickman attended Kilgore High School in Kilgore, Texas, where he played high school football at halfback and fullback as part of a dominant Bulldog running game with running back teammate Buddy Humphrey. He also lettered in baseball and basketball.

College career
Along with Humphrey, Hickman accepted a football scholarship from Baylor University, where he majored in Business with a minor in Vocal Performance. He lettered for the Bears from 1955–58, earning all-Southwest Conference honors in 1958. He was named a member of the Baylor football all-1950s team and was inducted into the Baylor Hall of Fame in 1973. Hickman married the former Shirley Winn of Gladewater while attending Baylor.

Professional football career
After playing college football for Baylor, Hickman was selected in third round (31st overall) of the 1959 NFL Draft by the Los Angeles Rams, rejoining Humphrey briefly before being traded to the Chicago Cardinals prior to the start of the 1959 season. He played two seasons in the NFL, one for the Cardinals (1959) and one for the Green Bay Packers (1960).

Hickman then went to the Canadian Football League where he played with three teams in three successive years from 1961 to 1963: the Hamilton Tiger Cats, Montreal Alouettes, and Toronto Argonauts. His best year as a running back was 1961, when he rushed for 447 yards and a 6.5 yards per carry average in Hamilton. That year, he played in the 49th Grey Cup game as Hamilton lost to the Winnipeg Blue Bombers in the first ever Grey Cup to ever go into overtime. Hickman suffered a badly sprained ankle in the game. Afterwards, he got progressively fewer chances to rush before retiring.

Life after football
After professional football, Hickman joined Texas Power & Light (later TU Electric), working in numerous cities and positions for almost 30 years. He retired from TU Electric in 1993 as their Tyler District Manager, and lived in Tyler for the remainder of his life. He and his wife had two children; daughter Lesa and son Winn. Larry Hickman died on February 10, 2017, at the age of 81.

References

1935 births
2017 deaths
American football fullbacks
American players of Canadian football
Canadian football running backs
Baylor Bears football players
Chicago Cardinals players
Green Bay Packers players
Hamilton Tiger-Cats players
Montreal Alouettes players
Toronto Argonauts players
People from Navarro County, Texas
Players of American football from Texas